Sara Warrington is a fictional character from the British soap opera Family Affairs, played by Beth Cordingly. She debuted on-screen during 2000 and left the show the following year.

Development
Sara develops feelings for Roy Farmer (Miles Petit) despite him being in a relationship with Claire Toomey (Tina Hall). She tries to seduce Roy by climbing naked into his bed. Petit told Sally Brockway from Soaplife that Roy does not feel able to be with Sara due to their age difference. He initially assumed a paternal role with her and thought her to be vulnerable. He feels sorry for her and gives guidance as he knows about drug addiction. Petit said that "Sara's still very immature and has never had a proper relationship. Roy sees her feeling for him as some schoolgirl crush and thinks he'd be taking advantage if he succumbed. He's been very strong because he's smitten with her." Sara decides to prove Roy wrong by attending a self-help clinic. Petit said that this development changed Roy's perception of Sara and ponders a future with her. Though Petit stressed that "he would desperately like to get involved, but he believes he should be protecting her." Meanwhile, Claire does not want Sara around because she knew Sara was taking Roy from her. Petit believed that his character would have to leave Claire because he truly loved Sara.

Storylines
A rebellious teenager who clashed with her young stepmother Nikki Warrington, Sara eventually left home to work as a lap dancer, spending much of her income on cocaine. Sara had relationships with Benji McHugh and Arlo Dean. Sara remained with Arlo longer. One night in August 2000, Sara overdosed on some Ecstasy Arlo had given her and nearly died. Arlo, racked with guilt, panicked and fled into the night. Fortunately, Sara survived. Luisa, Sara's mother made a reappearance in her life for several months., Luisa's boyfriend Tony made a pass at Sara which she denied. After all of this, Tony eventually left Charnham. Later on, Sara discovered her Brother Luke was having an affair with Nikki. This revelation tore the family apart. Sara then formed a relationship with Roy Farmer, despite being much younger than he was. This eventually fizzled out due to the age gap and a constant clash with Claire Toomey, who Roy was sharing his house with at the time. After getting herself back on her feet, she left to join Andrew in Wales. In December 2001 when Luke returned to Charnham, he mentioned Sara had gone missing while staying with friends (off-screen), she was eventually found.

Reception
A Soaplife reporter said that "selfish Sara" had a "warped logic" when she chose to sleep with her mother's boyfriend, Tony. They questioned "what is it about those Warringtons that makes them so keen to keep it in the family?"

References

Family Affairs characters
Television characters introduced in 2000
Female characters in television